The 1901 Miami Redskins football team was an American football team that represented Miami University during the 1901 college football season. Under new head coach Thomas Hazzard, Miami compiled a 1–3–1 record.

Schedule

References

Miami
Miami RedHawks football seasons
Miami Redskins football